Beatrice Spaziani (born 26 March 1984, in Terracina) is an Italian synchronised swimmer. In the 2004 Summer Olympics, held in Athens, Greece, she came seventh in the Women's Team competition and eighth in the Women's Duet competition (alongside Lorena Zaffalon).

References

1984 births
Living people
People from Terracina
Italian synchronized swimmers
Synchronized swimmers at the 2004 Summer Olympics
Olympic synchronized swimmers of Italy
Sportspeople from the Province of Latina